Maaya may refer to:

 Maaya (given name), a feminine Japanese given name
 Maaya (1972 film), an Indian Malayalam film
 Maaya (2014 film), an Indian Telugu film

See also
 Maya (disambiguation)